Hannington Sengendo is a Ugandan academic, urban planner and academic administrator. Currently, he is the vice chancellor of Nkumba University, a private University in Uganda, which was accredited by the Uganda National Council for Higher Education in 1999. He was installed in that position on Friday 21 June 2013.

Background
Sengendo was born in Kampala, Uganda's capital and largest city, on 14 November 1954.

Education
Sengendo attended Mengo Primary School. He studied at Mengo Senior Secondary School, for his O-Level education. He then attended Kololo Senior Secondary School for his A-Level studies. In 1975, he entered National Teachers College Kyambogo to study for the two-year Diploma in Education. The diploma was awarded by Makerere University. National Teachers College was amalgamated with other institutions in 2001 to form Kyambogo University.

Sengendo also holds a Bachelor of Arts degree from Makerere University and the degree of Master of Arts in Human Geography, obtained in 1987, from the University of Leeds. His degree of Doctorate in Urban Planning (PhD), was obtained in 1992, from the University of Nottingham.

Work history
His long service at Makerere University, included as Head of the Geography Department from 1994 until 2000. Later, he served as the Dean of the Faculty of Arts at the university. He then moved to Nkumba University, serving there as the deputy vice chancellor, before he was appointed vice chancellor in June 2013.

Personal life
Sengendo is a married father. He is of the Christian faith.

See also
 Uganda Universities
 UG Business Schools
 UG University Leaders
 Uganda Education
 Entebbe

References

External links
 List of Universities In Uganda

Living people
1954 births
Makerere University alumni
Alumni of the University of Leeds
Alumni of the University of Nottingham
People from Kampala District
People from Central Region, Uganda
Ganda people
Ugandan Christians
Vice-chancellors of universities in Uganda
Academic staff of Nkumba University